Caldecott is a former civil parish, now in the parish of Shocklach Oviatt and District, in the Borough of Cheshire West and Chester and ceremonial county of Cheshire in England. In 2001 it has a population of 24. The main settlement in the parish was Caldecott Green. The civil parish was abolished in 2015 to form Shocklach Oviatt and District.

References

External links

Former civil parishes in Cheshire
Cheshire West and Chester